894 Erda (prov. designation:  or ) is a bright background asteroid from the outer regions of the asteroid belt. It was discovered on 4 June 1918, by German astronomer Max Wolf at the Heidelberg-Königstuhl State Observatory. It was likely named after a character in Wagner's Der Ring des Nibelungen, "Erda", who is the goddess of wisdom, fate and Earth, borrowed from the Norse sagas, and referring to both Urðr and Jörð in Norse mythology.

Orbit and classification 

Erda is a non-family asteroid of the main belt's background population when applying the hierarchical clustering method to its proper orbital elements. It orbits the Sun in the outer main-belt at a distance of 2.8–3.5 AU once every 5 years and 6 months (2,013 days; semi-major axis of 3.12 AU). Its orbit has an eccentricity of 0.11 and an inclination of 13° with respect to the ecliptic.

Naming 

According to The Names of the Minor Planets by Paul Herget in 1955, and adopted by Lutz Schmadel in the Dictionary of Minor Planet Names, this minor planet was named after the Norse goddess described as the "incarnation of the nature", and as "a seer who knows the origin and the destination of all things".

The discoverer, Max Wolf, likely adopted the name from Wagner's opera cycle Der Ring des Nibelungen, which is loosely based on figures from the Norse sagas. In Wagner's Ring, the character , named after the Old High German word for "Earth", is the goddess of wisdom, fate and Earth. She is the world's wisest woman, the mother of the three Norns and of the valkyrie (shieldmaid) Brunhild, whose father is the norse chief god Odin (Wotan). Wagner, in turn, adopted the name from the treatise Deutsche Mythologie by Jacob Grimm (1785–1863) and other sources. Erda combines attributes of both, Urðr (wisdom and fate) and Jörð (the personification of Earth).

Physical characteristics 

In both the Tholen- and SMASS-like taxonomy of the Small Solar System Objects Spectroscopic Survey (S3OS2), Erda is an X-type asteroid.

Rotation period 

In June 2006, a rotational lightcurve of Erda was obtained from photometric observations by David Higgins at Hunters Hill Observatory , Australia, and by Rui Gonçalves at Linhaceira Observatory  in Portugal. Lightcurve analysis gave a well-defined rotation period of  hours with a brightness variation of  magnitude, significantly higher than previous observations had measured. The observers also found no indication of a previously speculated companion.

Diameter and albedo 

The Collaborative Asteroid Lightcurve Link derives an albedo of 0.1942 and a diameter of 36.26 kilometers based on an absolute magnitude of 9.6. On 17 April 2010, an asteroid occultation gave a best-fit ellipse dimension of 36.00 × 36.0 kilometers, while a second observation on 15 September 2014, measured an ellipse of 38.00 × 38.0 kilometers These timed observations are taken when the asteroid passes in front of a distant star.

References

External links 
 Lightcurve Database Query (LCDB), at www.minorplanet.info
 Dictionary of Minor Planet Names, Google books
 Asteroids and comets rotation curves, CdR – Geneva Observatory, Raoul Behrend
 Discovery Circumstances: Numbered Minor Planets (1)-(5000) – Minor Planet Center
 
 

000894
Discoveries by Max Wolf
Named minor planets
19180604